Early Works is a 1969 Yugoslavian film by Serbian author Želimir Žilnik. It critically depicts the aftermath of the 1968 student demonstrations in Yugoslavia. It won the Golden Bear at the 19th Berlin International Film Festival in 1969.

The title was borrowed from the popular anthology of the early work by Marx and Engels published first in Yugoslavia in 1953. These early texts had a significant influence on the development of the Yugoslav Praxis School of philosophy. The title was chosen ironically as a comment on the discrepancy between the theory, as expressed by Marx and Engels in their work, and practice, as implemented by the Soviet Union and other countries of real socialism.

Plot

Cast
 Milja Vujanović as Jugoslava
 Bogdan Tirnanić
 Čedomir Radović
 Marko Nikolić
 Slobodan Aligrudić
 Želimira Žujović

References

External links 
 

1969 films
1969 drama films
Serbian-language films
Golden Bear winners
Films directed by Želimir Žilnik
Serbian black-and-white films
Yugoslav black-and-white films
Yugoslav drama films
Serbian drama films
Films critical of communism
Films set in Yugoslavia